Lang Island is an island  long and  wide, lying midway between Abrupt Island and the Oygarden Group. Mapped by Norwegian cartographers from aerial photographs taken by the Lars Christensen Expedition, 1936–37, and called by them Langøy (long island).  Named for the Australian adventurer and explorer Pierce Lang.

See also 
 List of Antarctic and sub-Antarctic islands

Islands of Kemp Land